Since India gained independence from the United Kingdom in 1947, names of many cities, streets, places, and buildings throughout the republic of India have been systematically changed, often to better approximate their native endonymic pronunciation. Certain traditional names that have not been changed, however, continue to be popular.

States or provinces
 East Punjab to Punjab (change effective from 26 January 1950; state later trifurcated into modern-day Haryana, Himachal Pradesh and Punjab under the Punjab Reorganisation Act, 1966; Chandigarh became a Union territory and the shared capital city of Punjab and Haryana)
 United Provinces to Uttar Pradesh (change effective from 24 January 1950)
 Andhra State, the Telugu-speaking part of Madras Presidency, attained statehood on 1 October 1953. Three years later, Hyderabad State was invaded and combined with Andhra State and it was renamed Andhra Pradesh on 1 November 1956.
 Travancore–Cochin to Kerala (change effective from 1 November 1956)  
 Madras State to Tamil Nadu (change effective from 14 January 1969)
 Mysore State to Karnataka (change effective from 1 November 1973)
 Uttaranchal to Uttarakhand (change effective from 1 January 2007)
 Orissa to Odisha (official )

Union territories
 Laccadive, Minicoy and Amindivi Islands to Lakshadweep (change effective from 1 November 1973)
 Pondicherry to Puducherry (change effective from 1 October 2006)

Cities and towns

Andhra Pradesh
Former names of cities and towns in Andhra Pradesh at various times (Pre-Mauryan, Maurayan, Satavahana, Andhra Ikshvaku, Vishnukundina, Eastern Chalukya, Kakateeya, Musunuri, Pemmasani etc. rule) during the course of history. Andhra was mentioned as An-to-lo by Yuan Chang.
 Achanta or Marthandapuram 
 Amarapura (during Vishnukundina Dynasty and Dhanyakatakam during Satavahana dynasty) to Amaravati
 Avanigadda or Avanijapuram
 Bezawada (anciently Vijayavatika during Mahabharata Times and Rajendrachola pura during Telugu Chola Dynasty) to Vijayawada
 Bhavapuri to Bhaava-pattana to Bhavapatta or Bhavapattu to Bapatla, known for Bhavanarayanaswami Temple (Bapatla district)
 Birudankaravolu or Birudankitavolu or Birudankinavolu or Birudankitapuram or Birudankinapuram to Bighole or Biccavole to Biccavolu (East Godavari district)
 Dasanapura or Darsi
 Devapura or Devada (Vizianagaram district)
 Dhamnakada to Dhamnakata to Dhamnakataka to Dhyanakara or Dhaanyakapura or Dhaanyakataka (Mauryan and Satavahana times) or Dhaanyakatakamu to Dhanakataka to Dharanikota (Palnadu district)
 Dhandapura or Dhandaprolu or Tsandavolu to Chandavolu to Chandolu (Guntur district)
 Dhakshatapovana or Dhakshavatika or Dhaksharamamu to Draksharamam (East Godavari district)
 Dugdhapavanapuramu or Upamanyupuramu or Kshirapuramu or Kshiraramamu or Palakota (Palathota) or Palakolanu to Palakollu (West Godavari district)
 Durvasapuram to Duvva (West Godavari district)
 Ekasilanagaramu or Vontimitta to Ontimitta, known for (Potana wrote Andhra Mahabhagavatam at Ontimitta Ramalayam) (Kadapa district)
 Gajaranyam (in Kritayuga) to Madhavipuri (in Tretayuga) to Swargasopanam (in Dwaparayuga) to Marikapuri (in Kaliyuga) to Markapuram 
 Gadapa to Kadapa to Kurpah to Cuddapah (by British) to Kadapa
 Garthapuri or Guntur (Guntur district)
 Gonkavaram to Gokavaram, East Godavari district
 Govatika to Govada
 Gurajala to Gurazala (Palnadu district) or Jangamaheswarapuram
 Helapuri (Eastern Chalukya times) or Eluru to Ellore by British to Eluru (change effective 1949)
 Juvikallu to Julakallu to Zulakallu (Palnadu district)
 Madhavipattana or Gurindalastha to Gurijala or Gurajala to Gurazala (during British era)
 Kakinandiwada to Cocanada (by British) to Kakinada
 Kalidindi to Madhurantakacholanalluru (Telugu Choda times) to Kalidindi (Krishna District)
 Kanakagiri to Kanigiri (now in Prakasam District, previously in Nellore District)
 Kandanavrolu to Kandenavolu to Kurnool
 Kandarapura or Kanteru (Guntur District)
 Kantakasela or Kantikossula or Ghantasala
 Karmmarashtra (during Pallava period) for Ongole town and surroundings watered by Gundlakamma river.
 Kavali or Kanakapatnam
 Kharapuri to Karyampudi (venue of the battle of Palnadu) to Karampudi or Karempudi or Caurampoody (by Europeans) to Karampudi
 Kharamandalamu or Karimanal or Cholamandalam or Choramandalam to Choramandala (by the Portuguese) to Choromandel (by the Dutch) to Coromandal (by the British) 
 Kondapalli to Mustafanagar (during Qutub Shahi and early Asaf Jahi times) to Kondapalli
 Kondaveedu or Gopinathapuram to Murtazanagar (during Qutub Shahi and early Asaf Jahi times) to Kondaveedu
 Krövachuru to Krosuru (Palnadu district)
 Kundinapuram (near Kondaveedu) to Ameenabad (Guntur district)
 Mahadevicherla (cheruvu) or Mahadevitataka to Madevicherla to Macherla (Palnadu district)
 Mahendragiri or Pistapura or Pittapore to Pithapuram (East Godavari district)
 Matsyapuri (Mauryan and Satavahana times) or Masolia (as known by Greek and Roman historians) or Chepalarevu (locally) or Machilipatnam or Masulipatam (by British, Dutch) or Bandar (by Qutub Shahis and Asaf Jahis) to Bandaru or Machilipatnam
 Nelliooru or Nellipuram or Dhaanyapuram or Vikrama Simhapuri to Nelluru to Nellore by British
 Neminadhunuru to Nedunuru (Amalapuram Taluk West Godavri District)
 Niravadyapuramu or Niravadyaprolu (during Eastern Chalukya times) to Nidadavole to Nidadavolu
 Nrusimhapuri to Narasimhapuramu to Narasapur to Narasapuramu West Godavari District
 Ongole district to Prakasam district
 Pallavanadu or Palanadu or Pallenadu to Palnadu (Guntur district)
 Pattiseema or Pattisam
 Pedavegi or Vengipuram
 Peddapalli to Petapoly by the Dutch settlers to Pettipolee or Pettipoly by British or Nizampatnam (during Asaf Jahi era) (Guntur district)
 Puruhutikanagaram, Puruhutikapuram, Puruhutikapatnam, Peethikapuramu or Pistapura to Pithapuram (East Godavari district)
 Penuganchiprolu or Penukanchiprolu or Pennegentspoel (by Europeans) (Krishna district)
 Prathipalapura (Pre-Mauryan era) to Bhattiprolu (Krishna district)
 Prolavaram to Polavaram, Krishna district
 Prudhvipuram or Prudhilapuram or Podili
 Rajamahendravaramu or Rajamahendri to Rajahmundry to Rajamahendravaramu
 Rajavolu to Razole (by the British) or Rajolu
 Rayapudi or Rayaprolu
 Repalle or Revupalle
 Samarlakota to Samalkota (East Godavari district)
 Skandapuri or Kandukuru (Prakasam district)
 Srikakulamu to Chicacole or Sikkolu to Srikakulam
 Sriparvata (Maurayan and Satavahana times) or Vijayapuri to Nagarujunikonda or Nagarjunakonda (Guntur District)
 Tarakapuri or Tanuku (West Godavari district)
 Teravali or Tenali
 Kandarapura or Skandapura or Tambrapasthana or Tambrapa or Tambrapura or Tamrapuram or Chembrolu (capital of Ganapathideva Gaja Sahiniraya) to Chebrolu (Guntur District)
 Vakadu or Vandanapuri
 Vangalaprolu or Vangavolu to Vangolu to Ongolu to Ongole by British (Prakasam District)
 Vardhamanapuramu to Vardhamanu to Vaddamanu (Guntur district)
 Veligandla or Maarganaarayanapuramu to Veligandla (now in Prakasam District, previously in Nellore District)
Vengi or Pedavegi (West Godavari district)
 Vengipuram or Vengiparru or Vangaparru 
 Vidarbhapuri or Gudiwada (Krishna district)
 Vijayavatika (Mahabharata times) to Rajendracholapuram (Telugu Choda times) to Bejjamwada to Bezawada by British to Vijayawada
 Vishnukundinapuramu (Vishnukundina times) to Vinukonda (Palnadu district)
 Waltair to Vizagapatam to Visakhapatnam

Assam
 Nowgong to Nagaon
 Gauhati to Guwahati
 Sibsagar to Sivasagar

Chhattisgarh
 New Raipur to Atal Nagar (2018)

Gujarat
 Viravati to Chandravati, Chandravati to Vadpatra, Vadpatra to Baroda, Baroda to Vadodara (change effective 1974)
 Broach to Bharuch
 Cambay to Khambhat
 Bulsar to Valsad
 Suryapur to Surat
 Bhavena (Gohilwad) to Bhavnagar
 Riyazpur to Rajkot
 Hajipura to Bhuj
 Anandi Nagar to Gandhinagar
 Kutchhpura to Kutch
 Ahmednagar to Anand
 Begum Nadia Nagar to Nadiad

Haryana
 Gurgaon to Gurugram
Mustafabad to Saraswati Nagar
Amin to Abhimanyupur
Kinnar to Gaibi Nagar 
 Chamar Khera to Sundar Khera 
Khizrabad to Pratap Nagar
Ballabgarh to Balramgarh

Himachal Pradesh
 Simla to Shimla
 Mandav Nagar to Mandi

Goa
 Panjim to Panaji
 Sanquelim to Sankhali
 Curchorem to Kudchade

Karnataka
Bangalore to Bengaluru
Dharwar to Dharwad
Mangalore to Mangaluru
Mysore to Mysuru
Hubli to Hubballi
Tumkur to Tumakuru
Shimoga to Shivamogga
Belgaum to Belagavi
Bellary to Ballari
Gulbarga to Kalaburgi
Marcera to Madikeri
Bijapur to Vijayapura
Hospet to Hosapete 
Chikmagalur to Chikkamagaluru

Kerala
Trivandrum to Thiruvananthapuram 
 Cochin to Kochi
 Calicut to Kozhikode
 Quilon to Kollam
 Trichur to Thrissur
 Cannanore to Kannur
 Palghat to Palakkad
 Alleppey to Alappuzha
 Changanacherry to Changanassery
 Alwaye to Aluva
 Parur to Paravur
 Cranganore to Kodungallur
 Badagara to Vatakara
 Tellicherry to Thalassery
 Devi Colam to Devi Kulam
 Chirayinkil to  Chirayinkeezhu
 Mannarghat to Mannarkad
 Mannantoddy to Mananthavady
 Quilandy to Koyilandy
 Palai to Pala
 Sultan's Battery to Sultan Bathery
 Verapoly to Varapuzha
 Cherpalchery to Cherpulassery
 Koney to Konni
 Sherthalai to Cherthala
 Nethirimangalam to Pattambi

Madhya Pradesh
 Ahilyanagari/Indur to Indore
 Avantika to Ujjain
 Bhelsa to Vidisha
 Rassen to Raisen
 Saugor to Sagar
 Jubbulpore to Jabalpur
 Bhopal Bairagarh to Sant Hirda Ram Nagar, Bhopal
 Bellasgate to Bheraghat
 Ujjaini to Ujjain
 Mandu to Mandavgarh
 Hoshangabad to Narmadapuram
 Viratnagari to Shahdol
 Mhow to Dr. Ambedkar Nagar

Maharashtra
 Bombay to Mumbai 
 New Bombay to Navi Mumbai
 Nasik to Nashik
 Nagpore to Nagpur
 Khadki to Aurangabad to Sambhaji Nagar
 Chanda to Chandrapur
 Ellichpur to Achalpur
 Oomrawutty to Amravati
  Daulatabad to Devagiri
 Ambarapur to Ausa
Osmanabad to Dharashiv
 Poona to Pune
 Thana to Thane
 Bhir to Beed
 Ratnapur to Latur
 Mominabad to Ambajogai
 Ambanagari to Amravati
 Edlabad to Muktainagar
 Campoolie to Khopoli

Mizoram
 Saiha to Siaha

Nagaland
 Chumukedima to Chümoukedima

Odisha
 Balasore to Baleshwar
Wheeler Island to Abdul Kalam Island (change effective 4 September 2015)

Puducherry
 Pondicherry to Puducherry (change effective from 1 October 2006)
 Yanaon to Yanam (change effective from merger with Indian Union)

Punjab
 Jullunder to Jalandhar
 Ropar to Rupnagar
 Mohali to Sahibzada Ajit Singh Nagar
 Nawanshahr to Shaheed Bhagat Singh Nagar

Rajasthan
 Ajaymeru to Ajmer
 Dhedhi Dhani to Mansanagar (District Sikar) (change effective from 27 April 2011)
 Jeypore to Jaipur
 Jessulmere to Jaisalmer

Tamil Nadu
 Cape Comorin to Kanyakumari
 Ootacamund to Udagamandalam
 Conjeevaram to Kanchipuram
  Kombammeddu to Koyambedu
 Karuvur to Karur
 Madras to Chennai 
 Madura to Madurai 
 Porto Novo to Parangipettai
 Mayavaram to Mayiladuthurai
 Tanjore to Thanjavur
 Tinnevelly to Tirunelveli
 Tranquebar to Tharangambadi
 Triplicane to Thriuvallikeni
 Trichinopoly to Tiruchirapalli 
 Trinomalee to Tiruvannamalai
 Tuticorin to Thoothukudi
 Virudupatti to Virudhunagar
Talaivasal to Thalaivasal
Dharmapuri to Tharumapuri
Singapuram to Badushahbad to Chindiry  to Senji
Wandiwash to Vandavasi
Arcot to Aarkadu
Dindigul to Thindukkal
Ramnad to Ramanathapuram
Kudanthai to Kumbakonam
Thillai to Chidambaram
Negapatnam to Nagapattinam
Idaippadi to Edappadi
Aliyabad to Kalambur
Srirangam to Thiruvarangam
Arni to Aarani
Thirumaraikkadu to Vedaranyam

Telangana
 Adlapur to Adilabad
 Elagandla to Karimnagar
 Indur to Nizamabad
 Siddapur or Metukuseema or Gulshanabad to Medak
 Rukmampet or Palamoor to Mahabubnagar
 Orugallu to Warangal to Ekasilanagaram (not to be confused with old Ekasilanagaram of Vontimitta) or Warangal
 Bhuvanagiri to Bhongir
 Khambammettu to Khammam

Uttar Pradesh
 Cawnpore to Kanpur 
 Banaras to Varanasi 
 Mustafabad to Rampur
 Allahabad to Prayagraj 
 Faizabad district to Ayodhya District 
 Mughalsarai to Pandit Deen Dayal Upadhyay Nagar 
Firozabad to Chandra nagar

West Bengal
 Calcutta to Kolkata 
 Burdwan to Bardhaman
 Chinsurah to Chuchura
 Barahanagore to Baranagar
 Midnapore to Medinipur
 Contai to Kanthi
 Krishnagar to Krishnanagar
 Chandernagore to Chandannagar
 Ishapore to Ichapur

See also

Explanatory notes

References 

History of the Republic of India
Geographic history of India
Renamed
English exonyms
India
Renamed